Rosalind Mary Garcias de Cadiz  (15 June 1878 – 22 January 1955) and  Leila Gertrude Garcias de Cadiz (born c. 1879), known as the Cadiz sisters, were two sisters notable for their militant involvement in the Suffragette movement in Ireland. They went by the names Jane Murphy and Margaret (Maggie) Murphy during their militancy.

Biographies 
Born in Madras, India to Margarita Lawder, a Roscommon woman travelling to India and Thomas Raymond de Cadiz, a Spanish lawyer born in Trinidad, the sisters were two of six children in total. There were twins born in Dublin and the remainder during their parents time in India. The couple died within a few years of each other leaving the children to be raised first by their maternal aunt and cousins in St John’s House, Lecarrow, Co Roscommon.

The sisters became interested in the suffrage movement. In 1910, they joined the Irish Women's Franchise League as well as the Women's Social and Political Union in Britain. In 1912 the sisters were jailed in Holloway in the UK where they had undergone hunger strikes and force feeding. Later that year they were part of a group of eight women who smashed windows of government buildings in Dublin. All the women were given jail time in Mountjoy Prison, the length depending on the damage done. The Cadiz sisters were given 2 months each for it. Once again they both refused food while in prison. More militant than the Irish suffrage movement wanted, the sisters were eventually expelled from the Irish organisation in 1913. The sisters sued the Irish organisation but the case was thrown out.

In 1914 they wrote to The Irish Times calling for the franchise to be given to women before they would respond to the need for nurses in the First World War. Despite that position both women did volunteer and spent the war, and the Easter Rising, as nurses for the Red Cross on the Voluntary Aid Detachment. Rosie was injured with severe spine damage during the war which caused her mobility issues. She was discharged as a result. Both women also lost their fiancés to the war and did not marry. They lived the rest of their lives in Dublin. Rosie died in before her sister on 22 January 1955 aged 77 years old.

Both sisters received VAD certificates for their work as nurses but Leila also received a medal for the Hunger strike she undertook in 1912. The medal has an engraving.Presented to Leila Garcias de Cadiz by the Women's Social and Political Union in recognition of a gallant action, whereby through endurance to the last extremity of hunger and hardship, a great principle of political justice was vindicated.

References

Sources
 
 
 
 
 
 
 
 
 
 
 
 
 
 
 
 
 
 

Women in war 1900–1945
Women in war in Ireland
People of the Easter Rising
Irish suffragettes
Hunger Strike Medal recipients